Wild Geese may refer to:

Animals
 Geese
 Greylag geese, specifically

Literature
 Wild Geese (novel), a 1925 Canadian novel by Martha Ostenso
 The Wild Geese (Carney novel), a 1978 novel by Daniel Carney
 The Wild Geese (Mori novel), a 1911 Japanese novel by Ōgai Mori
 The Temple of the Wild Geese, a 1961 Japanese novella by Tsutomu Mizukami
 Wild Geese, a 1986 poem by Mary Oliver

Film and videos
 Wild Geese (film), a 1927 silent film based on the novel by Ostenso
 The Wild Geese (1953 film), a Japanese film based on the novel by Mori Ogai
 The Temple of Wild Geese, a 1962 Japanese film directed by Yūzō Kawashima
 The Wild Geese, a 1978 British mercenary war film based on Carney's novel
 Wild Geese II, a 1985 sequel to the above
 Code Name: Wild Geese, a 1980 Italian mercenary war film
 Wild Geese (video ballad), a 2006 English video ballad

Sports
 Wild Geese GAA, an Irish Gaelic Athletic Association club
 London Irish Wild Geese, a nickname of the London Irish Amateur rugby team
 Wild Geese GFC, an Irish GAA club formed in Southern California

Other
 Wild Geese (soldiers), Irish soldiers who served in European armies after being exiled from Ireland
 "Wild Geese" (song), a 1917 war poem by Walter Flex, set to music by Robert Götz
 Wild Geese, a rabbit in the Japanese manga Is the Order a Rabbit?

See also
 Wild Goose (disambiguation)